Annie Oakley is an 1894 black-and-white silent film from Edison Studios, produced by William K. L. Dickson with William Heise as cinematographer.

Synopsis
The film shows Oakley performing trick shooting as she was known for in her live shows.  The first scene was of Oakley shooting her Marlin 91 .22 caliber rifle 25 times in 27 seconds.  There is also a scene of her shooting composition balls in the air. The man assisting her is likely her husband, Frank E. Butler. Both were veterans of Buffalo Bill's Wild West show.

Cast
 Frank E. Butler as Self (uncredited)
 Annie Oakley as Self (uncredited)

Background 
The film is most notable for being Annie Oakley's first appearance on film. Thomas Edison had wanted to see if his kinetoscope could capture the smoke from a rifle, so he employed Oakley to film some of her shooting.  In 1894, kinetoscopes were installed in 60 locations in major cities around the country. Viewing the films cost a nickel. 

It was filmed on a single reel using standard 35 mm gauge at Edison's Black Maria studio in New York, November 1, 1895.  The original film had a 90-second runtime.  The surviving film is preserved by the Library of Congress.

See also
 List of Western films before 1920

References

External links
 
 
 
 
 Annie Oakley at the Library of Congress

1894 films
1894 Western (genre) films
1894 short films
American black-and-white films
American silent short films
Articles containing video clips
Films directed by William Kennedy Dickson
Films shot in New Jersey
Silent American Western (genre) films
Thomas Edison
1890s American films